Om Prakash Rao is an Indian film director, screenwriter, film producer and actor who primarily works in Kannada film industry. He has, till date, directed about 47 films in Kannada language.

Career
Om Prakash Rao's successful films such as Lockup Death (1996), Simhada Mari (1997), AK-47 (1999), Huchha and Kalasipalya (2004) have been huge blockbusters in Kannada cinema.

Controversies
Omprakash Rao was beaten up in Srirangapattina. The filmmaker, who was revealed as a director who took advantages of all actresses sexually, was said to have been physically abused for all his wrongdoings. The director couldn't even complete the shooting of his ongoing film. The film was said to have been stalled by angry people. Om Prakash Rao was said to have asked for sexual favours by actresses by offering them some top projects

Omprakash Rao and Guru Deshpande, and producers Diwakar Babu and Rajashekar, were caught on camera luring young girls with the promise of roles in films

Filmography

As director

As actor

References

External sources

Living people
Year of birth missing (living people)
20th-century Indian film directors
21st-century Indian film directors
21st-century Indian male actors
Bigg Boss Kannada contestants
Film directors from Bangalore
Film producers from Bangalore
Indian male film actors
Kannada film directors
Kannada film producers
Kannada screenwriters
Male actors from Bangalore
Male actors in Kannada cinema
Screenwriters from Bangalore